Tim or Timothy Matthews may refer to:

 Tim Matthews (actor) (born 1976), English actor
 Tim Matthews (racing driver) (born 1953), British racing driver
 Tim Matthews (athlete) (born 1974), Australian Paralympic athlete
 Tim Matthews (bishop) (1907–1991), Bishop of Quebec
 Timothy S. Matthews, United States Navy admiral